Hawke's Bay Airport , commonly referred to as Napier Airport, is Hawke's Bay's main commercial airport, serving domestic flights to the main centres of Auckland, Wellington and Christchurch, and smaller centres such as Gisborne. The airport is 5.8 km from Napier and 20.7 km from Hastings.

452,000 travellers passed through the terminal in the 12 months to June 2013. This increased to 652,426 in the 12 months to June 2017.

General
Hawke's Bay Airport is in Westshore, a suburb of Napier, and is sometimes referred to as Napier Airport. It is sited on the former Ahuriri Lagoon, an area that was raised above sea level by the 1931 Hawke's Bay earthquake. The airport is permitted to allow limited international flights for aircraft with up to fourteen people on board by prior arrangement with Air Napier or Skyline Aviation. Hastings Aerodrome is another, smaller airport, 22 km to the south near Hastings, used primarily for flight training and recreational aviation, which Hawke's Bay Airport does not offer.

History
The previous airport in Napier was the Embankment Aerodrome, which was started in 1932 and located near the Napier end of the Napier–Westshore road and rail embankment. The Napier Airport Board was formed in 1935 and the borough of Napier became owner of the aerodrome. While work was being done to bring it up to Civil Aviation Authority (CAA) standards, an alternative airfield was needed, so one was created near the shipping beacons between Westshore and Bay View. It was then realised that the Beacons Aerodrome had more space for further development, so the airport board made it Napier's main airport. It was chosen as Hawke's Bay's main airport in 1944. The CAA confirmed it as the airport for Hawke's Bay in 1957, but Hastings leaders objected, preferring to have an airport closer to their city. The Government set up an Airport Inquiry Committee in 1961 to settle the matter. They again confirmed the Beacons as the best option, and recommended the building of a Napier–Hastings motorway to provide quick access from Hastings. A new  runway was built and Hawke's Bay Airport officially opened in February 1964.

In 2010/11 the main runway was extended to 1750 metres with 240-metre Runway End Safety Areas at either end, which is long enough to accommodate jet services operated by Air New Zealand on domestic operations (Airbus A320 aircraft). A terminal reconfiguration, along with a full-scale security fence, would be required before scheduled domestic jet services could commence. At this stage further development to enable trans-Tasman services is not planned. Hawke's Bay Airport has received resource consent from the Napier City Council to begin Stage 1 of a significant multimillion-dollar business park development.

In November 2013, Hawke's Bay Airport announced advanced planning to further lengthen its main runway from 1750m to 1940m no later than 2018, and a significant terminal expansion and redevelopment to cope with significantly higher than projected annual increases in passengers numbers. A new NZ$25 million terminal building opened on 5 August 2021 after numerous delays due to the COVID-19 pandemic.

In the financial year ending June 2017, the airport saw record numbers pass through its doors, at 652,426. It remains the 7th busiest airport in New Zealand.

Airlines and destinations

Statistics

See also

 List of airports in New Zealand
 List of airlines of New Zealand
 Transport in New Zealand
 List of busiest airports in New Zealand

References

External links
Hawke's Bay airport website

Airports in New Zealand
Buildings and structures in Napier, New Zealand
Government-owned companies of New Zealand
Transport buildings and structures in the Hawke's Bay Region